James Cleary may refer to:

 James Vincent Cleary (1828–1898), Canadian Roman Catholic archbishop
 James W. Cleary (1927–2007), president of California State University, Northridge
 James Chip Cleary, head of the International Association of Amusement Parks and Attractions

See also
Jim Cleary (disambiguation)